This is a list of spaceflights launched between July and September 1965. For launches in the rest of the year, see 1965 in spaceflight (January–March), 1965 in spaceflight (April–June) and 1965 in spaceflight (October–December). For an overview of the whole year, see 1965 in spaceflight.

Launches

|colspan=8 style="background:white;"|

July
|-

|colspan=8 style="background:white;"|

August
|-

|colspan=8 style="background:white;"|

September
|-

|}

References

07
1965 in spaceflight 07